Geekie is a surname. Notable people with the surname include:

Conor Geekie (born 2004), Canadian ice hockey player
John Geekie, British governor of Bombay in 1742
Morgan Geekie (born 1998), Canadian ice hockey player